Tobi 30 - Coptic Calendar - Meshir 2

The first day of the Coptic month of Meshir, the sixth month of the Coptic year. On a common year, this day corresponds to January 26 of the Julian Calendar and February 8 of the Gregorian Calendar. This day falls in the Coptic Season of Shemu, the season of the Harvest.

Commemorations

Martyrs 

 The martyrdom of Saint Abadion, Bishop of Ansena

Other commemorations 

 The commemoration of the Second Ecumenical Council, held in Constantinople
 The consecration of the Church of Saint Peter, the Seal of Martyrs, in the Alexandria

References 

Days of the Coptic calendar